Doug Cole (2 July 1916 – 30 January 1959) was an English footballer, who played as a defender in the Football League for Chester.

References

Chester City F.C. players
Sheffield United F.C. players
Stalybridge Celtic F.C. players
Association football defenders
English Football League players
1916 births
1959 deaths
English footballers
People from Heswall